New Television, or NTV, is a television broadcaster in Mongolia. It is a subsidiary of NTV Broadcasting LLC which is owned by Batkhuu Gavaa and Mr. Batsaikhan P.

It was founded in 2006 and is currently employing about 70 people. Its TV broadcast is mostly in Mongolian with occasional shows in English including one of Mongolia's few English-speaking news teams.

NTV is the fourth most popular TV channel in Mongolia after MNB, UBS and Bolovsrol Television. It is also affiliated with Neo-Century Radio 107.00FM.

Sport broadcasting 

The channel previously broadcast Bundesliga  and Premier League highlights. It regularly broadcasts Mongolian national football team matches.

It was one of the 2018 FIFA World Cup broadcasters.

It no longer broadcasts UEFA Nations League matches.

See also
Media of Mongolia
Communications in Mongolia

References

Television companies of Mongolia
Television channels and stations established in 2006